P. K. Yonge Developmental Research School is a K-12 public school affiliated with the University of Florida, in Gainesville, Florida, United States. The student population, selected by lottery, is required to reflect the demographics of the school-age population of the State of Florida.

Organization
Established in 1934 in Norman Hall on the University of Florida campus, P.K. Yonge is a one-school school district and also a department of the University of Florida College of Education. A laboratory school (reflected in the school's former name, the P.K. Yonge Laboratory School), the school's mission is to design, test, and disseminate innovations in K-12 education by serving a diverse student community. The school director is Brian K. Marchman, Ph.D., and the principal is Carrie Geiger, Ed.D. Faculty, in addition to teaching duties, are required to engage in formal research projects each year, which are presented at an annual Inquiry Symposium attended by all P.K. Yonge faculty and colleagues from the University of Florida College of Education.

P.K. Yonge is named in honor of Philip Keyes Yonge (1850–1934), who served 29 years on the Florida Board of Control (the former governing body for all Florida public universities), including 22 years as chairman of the board.

At the beginning of the 2012–13 school year, P.K. Yonge opened a state-of-the-art elementary school building, and continues to work towards total campus revitalization. The second phase of campus revitalization ended with the opening of a state-of-the-art secondary school building in 2021.

Athletics
Teams at the school compete under the name "Blue Wave."  Kelly Barrett was appointed as athletic director in the 2017–18 school year. The boys' basketball program won the state championship in 1991.  The girls have won state championships four times: 1981, 1983, 2010, and 2012.  The school has also won state titles in boys' cross country (1980), boys' track and field (1965, 2005, 2006, 2007), girls' track and field (2005), and girls' volleyball (2000, 2002, 2014, 2015).

Performing Arts
P.K. Yonge's performing arts programs include a theatre department that hosts award-winning Thespian Troupe No. 4102 which competes yearly at Florida Thespian District 12 conferences and Florida State Thespian conferences. They have been known for presenting fall plays, spring musicals, and various public and student-created performance events. Students often audition for choirs.

The Blue Wave Marching Band and Color Guard
The marching band at P.K. Yonge has competed in Florida Marching Band Championships (FMBCs) since it was established in 1997 as the Florida Marching Band Coalition. It is currently directed by Robert Marski since the 2018–19 school year. At FMBC 2018, the marching band received sixth place, with percussion winning their caption. At FMBC 2021, The PKY Band made the finals for the first time in school history, and placed third overall in class 1A states.  The Color Guard marches as a part of the Blue Wave Marching Band, and also competes in the winter season as the P.K. Yonge Winterguard.

Branding 

P.K. Yonge developed a new official brand during the 2014–15 school year. There are two logos, an administrative/academic logo and an athletics logo which depicts the school's Blue Wave.

Notable alumni 

 Robert Baker – Auburn Tigers wide receiver
 Doug Dickey – College Football Hall of Fame coach
 Chris Doering – Florida Gators wide receiver
 Terry Jackson – Florida Gators running back
 Willie Jackson – Florida Gators wide receiver
 T. L. Latson (class of 1992) – professional basketball player
 Randall Leath Florida Gators Basketball Player
 Stan Lynch (class of 1973) - professional drummer, best known for work with Tom Petty and the Heartbreakers
 Travis McGriff – Florida Gators wide receiver
 Sally Menke (class of 1972) – Oscar-nominated film editor
 Rodney Mullen (class of 1984) – professional skateboarder
 Bernie Parrish –  NFL Championship cornerback (1964)
 Derrick Robinson (class of 2006) - Cincinnati Reds outfielder
 Fred Rothwell – NFL player
 Peter Small – groundbreaking researcher on tuberculosis and AIDS
 Ralph Turlington - Speaker of the Florida House (1966-1968) and Florida Commissioner of Education (1974-1986)
 Jordan Williams – NFL player
 Jack May (class of 1954) - Winner of 1975 Cannonball Baker Sea-To-Shining-Sea Memorial Trophy Dash

See also
 Buildings at the University of Florida

References

External links
 
 P. K. Yonge Library of Florida history

High schools in Alachua County, Florida
Educational institutions established in 1934
Public high schools in Florida
Public middle schools in Florida
Public elementary schools in Florida
Laboratory schools in the United States
University-affiliated schools in the United States
1934 establishments in Florida